Moses Khabane Khongoana is a Mosotho film director and maker.

Early life 
Khabane Moses Khongoana is a remarkably talented entrepreneurial filmmaker who is extremely committed and dedicated to his craft, won eight International Entrepreneurial and Filmmaking Awards and thirteen Certificates/Appreciations. Khongoana studied Media, Communication and Broadcasting under Degree in Television and Film Production at Limkokwing University of Creative Technology and his first Award-winning independent film "Bullet" competed in numerous international film festival including Luxor African Film Festival as its primary international film festival to screen it. He also holds Certificate in Business Studies of City and Guilds of London Institute.
Khongoana is a member of the Motion Picture Association of Lesotho, where he sits on numerous operational groups and committees that are working towards establishing a formal television and film industry in Lesotho. Khongoana pitched and worked with numerous Art creatives, NGO's, Government and Private Institutes across several projects.

Filmography 

AWARDS WINNING PRODUCTIONS

Bullet (Short Film) – Producer, Director & Cinematographer
• Best Short Film Award at Lesotho Film Festival 2015

Lenaka-la-Balimo (Feature Film) - Script Editor, Director, Editor &Cinematographer
• Best Feature Film Award at Lesotho film festival 2016.

True Hearts (Short Film) – Writer, Animator, Director and Editor
• Special Mention Award at Lesotho film festival 2017

The Legacy (Short Film) – Cinematographer and Editor
• Jury Award at Lesotho Film Festival 2017

Phokojoe Ea Matsatsa (Short Film) –Director, Cinematographer & Editor
• Special Mention Award at Lesotho film festival 2018

Appreciate Me (Short Documentary Film) – Producer, Director, Cinematographer & Editor
• United Nations Lesotho Media Competition – Best Media Feature/Short Doc Film

Awards 
Tan Sri Dato’ Sri Paduka Limkokwing Award for Creativity and Innovation 2016.

Maluti Mountain Brewery Kickstart Grand Award 3rd Round

United Nations Lesotho Media Competition – Best Media Feature/Short Doc

Film Filminute International Film Festival 2018 – Top 5 World Best One Minute Films

Selected for YAFMA AWARDS 2019 - (Belgium).

Lesotho Film Festival 2015, Best Student Film Award.

Lesotho Film Festival 2016, Best Feature Film Award.

Lesotho Film Festival 2017, Special Mention Award

Lesotho Film Festival 2017, Jury Award

Lesotho Film Festival 2018, Special Mention Award

Lesotho Film Festival 2015, Certificate of Appreciation.

Lesotho Film Festival 2016, Certificate of Participation.

Lesotho Film Festival 2016, Certificate of Participation.

Lesotho Film Festival 2017, Certificate of Participation.

Lesotho Film Festival 2017, Certificate of Participation.

Lesotho Film Festival 2017, Certificate of Participation.

Lesotho Film Festival 2018, Certificate of Participation.

Lesotho Film Festival 2018, Certificate of Participation.

Golden Frames International Short Film Festival 2016, Certificate of Screening (Mumbai, India)

International Short & Independent Film Festival Dhaka 2016, Certification of Participation (Bangladesh, India)

Luxor African Film Festival 2016, Nominee (Egypt)

Ginora Film Festival 2016, Nominee (Spain)

Industry BOOST Competition 2016, Finalist (Miami, Florida)

Afro film festival “Ananse” 2016, Official selection (Colombia, U.S.A)

Indiewise virtual festival 2017, Official selection (Florida, Miami)
 
Wiper Film Festival 2016, Official selection (U.S.A, New York)

Josiah Media Festival 2016, Official selection (U.S.A, New York)

References 

Living people
Lesotho film directors
Year of birth missing (living people)